Magnolia is a town in Duplin County, North Carolina, United States. The population was 939 at the 2010 census.

History
The Roger Dickson Farm was listed on the National Register of Historic Places in 1988.

Geography
Magnolia is located in western Duplin County at  (34.895620, -78.055008). U.S. Route 117 passes through the center of town, leading north  to Warsaw and south  to Wallace. I-40 leads south  to Wilmington and north  to Raleigh.

Demographics

2020 census

As of the 2020 United States census, there were 831 people, 326 households, and 220 families residing in the town.

2000 census
As of the census of 2000, there were 932 people, 343 households, and 233 families residing in the town. The population density was 900.0 people per square mile (346.0/km2). There were 384 housing units at an average density of 370.8 per square mile (142.6/km2). The racial makeup of the town was 38.63% White, 41.20% African American, 0.32% Native American, 0.21% Asian, 17.27% from other races, and 2.36% from two or more races. Hispanic or Latino of any race were 25.11% of the population.

There were 343 households, out of which 34.1% had children under the age of 18 living with them, 42.9% were married couples living together, 19.2% had a female householder with no husband present, and 31.8% were non-families. 27.1% of all households were made up of individuals, and 13.1% had someone living alone who was 65 years of age or older. The average household size was 2.71 and the average family size was 3.25.

In the town, the population was spread out, with 28.3% under the age of 18, 9.4% from 18 to 24, 28.6% from 25 to 44, 20.0% from 45 to 64, and 13.6% who were 65 years of age or older. The median age was 34 years. For every 100 females, there were 86.0 males. For every 100 females age 18 and over, there were 86.1 males.

The median income for a household in the town was $22,269, and the median income for a family was $25,962. Males had a median income of $17,857 versus $20,568 for females. The per capita income for the town was $10,628. About 22.8% of families and 25.4% of the population were below the poverty line, including 28.3% of those under age 18 and 17.8% of those age 65 or over.

References

External links
Town of Magnolia official website

Towns in Duplin County, North Carolina
Towns in North Carolina